Je t'aime, je t'aime ("I Love You, I Love You") is a 1968 French science fiction film directed by Alain Resnais from a screenplay by Jacques Sternberg. The plot centres on Claude Ridder (Claude Rich) who is asked to participate in a mysterious experiment in time travel when he leaves the hospital after a suicide attempt. The experiment, intended to return him after one minute of observing the past, instead causes him to experience his past in a disjointed fashion.

The film was listed to compete at the 1968 Cannes Film Festival, but the festival was cancelled due to the countrywide wildcat strike that occurred in May 1968 in France.

While seldom ranked among Resnais's best works, Je t'aime, je t'aime has received positive reviews since its release. Its synopsis has been cited as an influence on the 2004 Michel Gondry film Eternal Sunshine of the Spotless Mind.

Plot
Claude Ridder (Claude Rich) is leaving hospital after an attempt at suicide by shooting himself through his heart, when he is asked to participate in a mysterious experiment in time travel by a private research body. They have succeeded in sending mice back unharmed for periods of one minute, but need to send a human back to confirm the subject did actually revisit the past. Claude agrees, but instead of returning promptly as the mice had done, he re-experiences many episodes from his past in a highly disjointed and fragmented manner, in interludes of seconds or minutes.

Claude's observations culminate in his admission – which, throughout the movie, he has frequently dismissed as a fabrication – that he had killed his morbid, sad, and terminally ill life partner, Catrine (Olga Georges-Picot), painlessly by gas poisoning, upon seeing her in her sleep – for the first time in her life – completely happy and without fear. Subsequently, his attempted suicide is shown to emerge from the painful realization that not only can he not live with her, he cannot live without her.

The researchers wait an hour before concluding they will never get him out of the time machine. As they leave the lab, they happen upon Ridder's body on the grass, a gunshot through his heart. Seemingly, in the instant of revisiting his suicide attempt, he has traversed not only time but space as well and broken out of the time machine – as a man who is about to die. As his mortally wounded body is carried inside by the scientists, he opens his mouth in a struggle to speak, and a single teardrop falls down his cheek. His fate – that is, whether or not the "second" suicide attempt was successful – is left ambiguous.

Cast
 Claude Rich as Claude Ridder
 Olga Georges-Picot as Catrine
 Anouk Ferjac as Wiana Lust
 Alain MacMoy as Le technicien qui vient chercher Ridder
 Vania Vilers as Le technicien-chauffeur
 Ray Verhaeghe as Le technicien aux souris
 Van Doude as Jan Rouffer, le chef du centre de recherches de Crespel
 Yves Kerboul as Le technicien au tableau noir
 Dominique Rozan as Le médecin de Crespel / Doctor Haesserts
 Annie Bertin as La jeune femme à la trompette
 Jean Michaud as Le directeur de la maison de diffusion
 Claire Duhamel as Jane Swolfs
 Bernard Fresson as Bernard Hannecart
 Sylvain Dhomme as L'homme qui invite Ridder à dîner
 Irène Tunc as Marcelle Hannecart

Reception

Box office
According to Fox records the film required $875,000 in rentals to break even and by 11 December 1970 had made $450,000 so made a loss to the studio.

Critical response 
Today, Je t'aime, je t'aime is reviewed positively by critics; review aggregator Rotten Tomatoes reports 83% approval (based on six critics' reviews), with an average rating of 7.5/10. IMDB reviewers gave the film the average rating of 7.2/10. The film made two critics’ top-10 lists in the 2012 Sight & Sound polls of the greatest films ever made.

Penelope Houston, writing in Sight and Sound winter issue of 1969-1970, praised Resnais for the film's editing, saying that "one has never been more aware of Resnais exploring time through timing: matchless editing, an unfailing instinct for the duration of a shot."

Manohla Dargis of The New York Times highlighted the theme of memory in the film, "Claude’s journeys into the past resemble nothing less than memory — fragmented, inconstant, taunting, joyous and heartbreaking. We are, the movie reminds us, what we remember, with a consciousness built from reminiscences that flicker, fade and repeat, flicker, fade and repeat."

After Kino Lorber's Blu-ray release of the film in 2015, American film critic Jonathan Rosenbaum wrote, "but for better and for worse, Je t’aime je t'aime functions as a first-person narrative, even more than Resnais’ earlier Hiroshima mon amour and his later masterpiece Providence, although we may have some trouble accepting its melancholy and marginal protagonist, a sort of bureaucratic fixture whose professional identity resides in the fringes of the publishing world, as a full-fledged hero."

David Gregory Lawson of Film Comment wrote, "Alain Resnais’s psychologically bruising film maudit is a sci-fi romance that charts a long-term relationship’s evolution from an atypically sullen meet-cute to the bitter resentment only the profound understanding of another human being can breed," and noted the use of time travel as a film device that explores "exploring the obstacles life poses to receiving or displaying affection and for probing the pleasures of solitude."

Leo Gray of The Baltimore Suns summarized the film, "this 1968 film's title, "Je t'aime, je t'aime," translated into English is "I love you, I love you," which suggests that what you are about to watch very well could be a sappy French romance. Nothing could be further from the truth. Instead, director Alain Resnais' film is a futuristic psychological drama and a deep dive into the disturbing nuances of a damaged relationship and the suicidal mind."

References

External links

1968 films
1960s avant-garde and experimental films
1960s French-language films
1960s science fiction films
French avant-garde and experimental films
French science fiction films
Films directed by Alain Resnais
Films about time travel
1960s French films